Ricardo Pinto (born January 23, 1965) is a retired professional association footballer who played as a goalkeeper for several Campeonato Brasileiro Série A clubs and for Primera División Paraguaya club Cerro Porteño. He is the current coach of Paraná Clube.

Playing career
Born  in Iconha, Espírito Santo, Pinto's career started in 1982, playing for Desportiva Ferroviária's youth team. After two years in the club, he moved to Fluminense's youth team, where he won the Copa São Paulo de Juniores in 1986. He stayed in Fluminense's youth team until he professionalized in 1987, being promoted to the club's main team.

Ricardo Pinto started his professional career in 1987, joining Fluminense's first team in 1988, playing 85 Campeonato Brasileiro Série A matches for the Rio de Janeiro team, until he left the club in 1992. In 1992 and in 1993, he played for Cerro Porteño, of Paraguay, where he won the 1992 Primera División Paraguaya season. Ricardo Pinto then returned to Brazil, playing for Americano in 1993, União São João in 1994, and Corinthians in 1994 and in 1995, where he played 3 Campeonato Brasileiro Série A matches, and won the Copa do Brasil in 1995 and the Campeonato Paulista in the same year. Ricardo Pinto played 43 Campeonato Brasileiro Série A matches for Atlético Paranaense from 1995 to 1997, and won the Campeonato Brasileiro Série B in 1995. During a 1996 Campeonato Brasileiro Série A match against his former club, Fluminense, at Estádio das Laranjeiras, a supporter of the Rio de Janeiro-based club struck him with a tripod. After the match, Ricardo Pinto was submitted to head surgery. In 1998, he briefly played for Internacional-SP and Iraty, before moving to Goiás, where he played 21 Campeonato Brasileiro Série A matches, leaving the club in 1999. In 1999, he retired while playing for Joinville.

Coaching career
After his retirement, the former goalkeeper opened a football academy in Curitiba, Paraná, and started a managerial career, firstly managing Atlético Paranaense's youth team, then working as the club's goalkeeper coach in 2001. He eventually managed Operário Ferroviário in 2005,  and Marcílio Dias in 2005 and in 2006.  In 2007, Ricardo Pinto was J. Malucelli's manager, then Força from 2007 to 2008. In 2008, he also managed Uberaba and Lemense.

Honors
Ricardo Pinto won the following honors during his playing career:

References

1965 births
Living people
Brazilian footballers
Brazilian football managers
Brazilian expatriate footballers
Expatriate footballers in Paraguay
Fluminense FC players
Cerro Porteño players
Americano Futebol Clube players
União São João Esporte Clube players
Sport Club Corinthians Paulista players
Club Athletico Paranaense players
Associação Atlética Internacional (Limeira) players
Iraty Sport Club players
Goiás Esporte Clube players
Joinville Esporte Clube players
Club Athletico Paranaense managers
Operário Ferroviário Esporte Clube managers
Clube Náutico Marcílio Dias managers
Uberaba Sport Club managers
Red Bull Brasil managers
Paraná Clube managers
Association football goalkeepers